Tomáš Ujfaluši (born 24 March 1978) is a Czech former professional footballer. He operated as either a central defender or a right back.

Other than in his country he played professionally in Germany (four years), Italy (four), Spain (three) and Turkey (two), winning six major titles between Hamburger SV, Atlético Madrid and Galatasaray. He started his career in 1996 with Sigma Olomouc.

Ujfaluši played seventy eight times for the Czech Republic, representing the nation at the 2006 World Cup and two European Championships.

Club career

Early years / Hamburg / Fiorentina
Born in Rýmařov, Czechoslovakia of Hungarian roots – Ujfaluši made his professional debut with SK Sigma Olomouc, at the age of 18. In December 2000, he moved abroad and signed with German club Hamburger SV: his debut came on 10 December by playing 90 minutes in a 2–1 home win against FC Energie Cottbus, and 16 of his 17 appearances in that season were complete, but the team could only rank 13th and 11th the following campaign, with respectively 58 and 57 goals conceded.

In 2002–03 Ujfaluši helped Hamburg finish in fourth position, but the team fared worse in the following season (again conceding in the region of 50 Bundesliga goals). Subsequently, he signed with ACF Fiorentina, freshly returned to Serie A after successfully emerging from a bankruptcy situation.

Atlético Madrid

After nearly 150 official appearances for the Viola (albeit without silverware), being mainly used as a centre back by coach Cesare Prandelli, Ujfaluši joined Atlético Madrid as a free agent, helping the capital team repeat its fourth position in La Liga in his debut season, subsequently qualifying for the 2009–10 UEFA Champions League.

In the 2009–10 league campaign Atlético only finished ninth, but won the newly created UEFA Europa League, with Ujfaluši appearing in eight complete matches in the latter competition. On 19 September 2010, during injury time of a 1–2 league loss against FC Barcelona at the Vicente Calderón Stadium, he made a late challenge on Lionel Messi, injuring his right ankle. The defender received a straight red card for his foul, and was subsequently banned for two games by the Spanish League's disciplinary committee; he was an undisputed starter during the season – mostly as right-back – as the Colchoneros finished seventh and qualified to the Europa League.

Galatasaray
On 20 June 2011, aged 33, Ujfaluši signed for Süper Lig club Galatasaray, for a €2 million transfer fee. He was an undisputed starter in his first season, being sent off in the final game of the campaign, a 0–0 away draw against Fenerbahçe SK, as Gala won a record-equalling 18th league title.

Ujfaluši left Galatasaray at the end of 2012–13, after a lengthy injury. He retired in December at the age of 35, after a few months back in his homeland with AC Sparta Prague.

On 18 December 2013 Ujfaluši returned to Galatasaray, being appointed director of football. He left his post in June of the following year.

International career

Ujfaluši gained his first cap for the Czech Republic in 2001, whilst at Hamburg. He represented the nation at UEFA Euro 2004 (appearing in four matches for the semifinalists), the 2006 FIFA World Cup – being sent off against Ghana in an eventual group stage exit– and Euro 2008 (three games, being named Man of the match in the first game of the tournament, a 1–0 win against Switzerland).

After nine years with the national team, during which he eventually gained captaincy, Ujfaluši ended his international career on 8 April 2009 after being criticised for visiting a restaurant, accompanied by five other players, following the Czech Republic's defeat to Slovakia on 1 April for the World Cup qualification.

Career statistics

Club

International

Honours
Hamburger SV
DFB-Ligapokal: 2003

Atlético Madrid
UEFA Europa League: 2009–10
UEFA Super Cup: 2010

Galatasaray
Süper Lig: 2011–12, 2012–13
Turkish Super Cup: 2012

Individual
Süper Lig Defender of the Year: 2011–12
Fiorentina All-time XI

References

External links

 
 
 
 
 

1978 births
Living people
People from Rýmařov
Czech people of Hungarian descent
Czech footballers
Association football defenders
Czech First League players
SK Sigma Olomouc players
AC Sparta Prague players
Bundesliga players
Hamburger SV players
Serie A players
ACF Fiorentina players
La Liga players
Atlético Madrid footballers
Süper Lig players
Galatasaray S.K. footballers
Czech Republic youth international footballers
Czech Republic under-21 international footballers
Czech Republic international footballers
UEFA Euro 2004 players
2006 FIFA World Cup players
UEFA Euro 2008 players
Olympic footballers of the Czech Republic
Footballers at the 2000 Summer Olympics
Czech expatriate footballers
Expatriate footballers in Germany
Expatriate footballers in Italy
Expatriate footballers in Spain
Expatriate footballers in Turkey
Czech expatriate sportspeople in Germany
Czech expatriate sportspeople in Italy
Czech expatriate sportspeople in Spain
Czech expatriate sportspeople in Turkey
UEFA Europa League winning players
Sportspeople from the Moravian-Silesian Region